Tiputa Pass is a strait in the northwest portion of Rangiroa lagoon in the Tuamotu Islands of French Polynesia, joining the lagoon to the open ocean. There are only two such passes in Rangiroa, the second one being Avatoru Pass. Tiputa Pass separates the villages of Avatoru and Tiputa.

Scuba diving 
Tiputa Pass is a well-known scuba-diving destination. During the austral summer (December to March), great hammerhead sharks and manta rays are present in the area.

References 

Bodies of water of French Polynesia
Straits of Oceania